Bob's Burgers is an American animated television sitcom created by Loren Bouchard for the Fox Broadcasting Company. The series centers on the Belcher family, consisting of parents Bob (H. Jon Benjamin) and Linda (John Roberts) and their children Tina (Dan Mintz), Gene (Eugene Mirman) and Louise (Kristen Schaal), who run a hamburger restaurant. Bob's Burgers was conceived by Bouchard after he developed Home Movies. Bob's Burgers is a production by Bento Box Entertainment and 20th Television Animation. The show is said to fill the void created by the conclusion of King of the Hill, which executive producer Jim Dauterive worked on for nearly its entire run.

A total of  episodes have been broadcast. All episodes are approximately 22 minutes without commercials, and are broadcast in both high-definition and standard. The series' episodes are also available for download at the iTunes Store in standard and high-definition qualities, and Amazon Video, with new episodes appearing the day after their live airing. Fox Video on Demand also releases episodes of the show, typically one to two days after their original airing. It can also be found on Hulu, with episodes available the day after their broadcast, and Yahoo! View, with episodes available a week after their broadcast.

The first season was released on DVD on April 17, 2012 in Region 1 by 20th Century Fox Home Entertainment. Bob's Burgers first season averaged 5.07 million viewers in the 2010–11 television season, with the season's first episode, "Human Flesh", being the highest-rated new series premiere of the television season. The second season of Bob's Burgers averaged 4.18 million viewers, as part of the 2011–12 television season and the third season consisted of an average of 4.11 million views per episode in the 2012–13 television season.  The first season consisted of 13 episodes, the second consisted of 9, the third consisted of 23, the fourth consisted of 22, the fifth consisted of 21, the sixth consisted of 19, the seventh consisted of 22, the eighth consisted of 21, and the ninth season onwards consists of 22. While season 1 received mostly mixed reviews, since season 2, Bob's Burgers has received positive reviews from critics.

On January 26, 2023, Fox renewed the show for 14th and 15th production cycles.

Series overview

Episodes

Season 1 (2011)

Season 2 (2012)

Season 3 (2012–13)

Season 4 (2013–14)

Season 5 (2014–15)

Season 6 (2015–16)

Season 7 (2016–17)

Season 8 (2017–18)

Season 9 (2018–19)

Season 10 (2019–20)

Season 11 (2020–21)

Season 12 (2021–22)

The Bob's Burgers Movie (2022)

Season 13 (2022–23)

Short

Future episodes

References

External links
 at Fox.com

 
Lists of American adult animated television series episodes
Lists of American sitcom episodes